Fred Hamm was a Chicago jazz orchestra leader and co-author of the song "Bye Bye Blues." In 1925 he took over the leadership of the Benson Orchestra (founded by Edgar Benson). He sang and played the cornet. Among the members of his band were Dave Bennett (who played clarinet and alto saxophone), Chauncey Gray (piano), and Bert Lown (violin). With Bennett, Gray, and Lown, he co-wrote "Bye Bye Blues" in early 1925.

Fred spent his later years at the Hotel Baker Retirement Home, located on the Fox River, in St. Charles Illinois.

External reference
Discography

References

Year of birth missing
Year of death missing
Musicians from Chicago